HMS Centurion was a 50-gun fourth rate ship of the line of the Royal Navy, launched in 1691 at Deptford Dockyard.

She served until 1728, when she was broken up.

Notes

References

Lavery, Brian (2003) The Ship of the Line - Volume 1: The development of the battlefleet 1650-1850. Conway Maritime Press. .

Ships of the line of the Royal Navy
1690s ships